Kendrick Cross (born May 1, 1971) is an American actor.

Early life
Cross was born in Louisville, Kentucky and raised in South Carolina.

Career
He began acting on stage, before appearing on television, in episodes of Dawson's Creek, Army Wives, Drop Dead Diva and One Tree Hill. Cross had a recurring roles on The Game, The Haves and the Have Nots and Saints & Sinners. He also guest starred on Born Again Virgin, House of Cards, Homeland, Dynasty and Black Lightning.

In 2019, Cross starred in the Oprah Winfrey Network prime time soap opera, Ambitions. The series was canceled after single season. In 2021, he had a recurring role on Queen Sugar and appeared on Genius: Aretha. In 2022, Cross had a recurring role as Agent Wallace in the fourth season of Netflix series, Stranger Things, and starred in the Allblk horror anthology series, Terror Lake Drive.

In film, Cross has appeared in For Colored Girls (2010), The 5th Wave (2016), All Eyez on Me (2017), Acrimony (2018), Tales from the Hood 2 (2018), Goosebumps 2: Haunted Halloween (2018), and The War with Grandpa (2020).

In January 2023, he joined the cast of General Hospital in the recurring role of Detective Bennett.

References

External links

Living people
African-American male actors
American male television actors
21st-century American male actors
1971 births
Male actors from Louisville, Kentucky